Castlevania: Portrait of Ruin is a platform-adventure game developed and published by Konami. The game was released on November 16, 2006 in Japan, and in North America on December 5, 2006 for the Nintendo DS handheld game console. Portrait of Ruin is the first Castlevania to feature a cooperative multiplayer gameplay mode and the first handheld Castlevania to have English voice-overs, outside of its original Japanese release.

Portrait of Ruin is set in 1944 Europe during World War II, and is a continuation of the story from Castlevania: Bloodlines.  The game introduces protagonists and antagonists to the Castlevania series as well as expand on the two character gameplay found in the previous Nintendo DS Castlevania title, Castlevania: Dawn of Sorrow.  Portrait of Ruin has met with an overall positive critical response and has received high ratings from reviews, along with several awards.

Gameplay 
Portrait of Ruin features a 2D side-scrolling style of gameplay.  One of the main features to the gameplay is that players can switch freely between two characters, Jonathan and Charlotte, similar to the "Julius mode" from Castlevania: Dawn of Sorrow.  Jonathan and Charlotte can combine their powers to perform a powerful attack together known as "Dual Crush", and their combined abilities are needed in certain parts of the castle for them to solve puzzles and progress through the story.  For example, the player must have both characters board two "motorcycles" and alternate between them to dodge obstacles to have both motorcycles intact to crash through a wall.

Aside from Dracula's castle, Jonathan and Charlotte explore other environments such as Egyptian-like deserts and London-like towns via paintings dispersed throughout the castle.  During the adventure, the heroes encounter 155 different enemies, which are kept track in a bestiary.  Many enemies from previous Castlevania titles make appearances either as standard monsters or bosses for the sections of the castle and paintings.  As they progress, the duo learn new skills and acquire equipment and items which allow further exploration in the game.

Like previous Castlevania games, this game features alternate endings.  Portrait of Ruin has two different endings.  Both involve Jonathan and Charlotte preventing Dracula from being resurrected, but only one involves the defeat of Brauner, another vampire enemy, and the Actual defeat of Dracula.  At one point in the game, the player's actions determine which ending will be obtained.  The first ending is normally referred to as the "bad" ending because the main objectives of the game's story are not completed; to indicate this, the game will display a "Game over" screen instead of the credits.  The second ending completes those objectives and allows the player to explore more of Dracula's castle and gain access to more paintings.  This ending is considered the canonical ending to the game.

Alternate modes 
Portrait of Ruin features alternate modes of gameplay; four single player modes for the main story and a "Boss Rush" mode that can be played with either one or two players.  Aside from Health and Magic Power enhancements, items cannot be obtained nor used in any of the extra modes of the main game.  Initially, only one story mode is available and features the main protagonists, Jonathan and Charlotte.  After obtaining the better of the two endings with Jonathan and Charlotte, the player will unlock a prologue to the main story, "Sisters Mode", and additional stages in the Boss Rush Mode.  Completing the game also gives the player the option to increase the difficulty, add level caps on new games, and start a game with all previously obtained items and skills.  If the player meets certain requirements in the game, two other versions of the main story mode are made available; "Richter Mode" and "Old Axe Armor Mode".
 In "Sisters Mode", the player controls Loretta and Stella Lecarde.  This mode serves as a prologue to the storyline in Jonathan's Mode.  They have different controls compared to the normal gameplay in that attacks are controlled completely with the stylus.  Loretta is able to use an ice spell which is aimed with the player's stylus, and Stella is able to damage enemies and objects that the player passes the stylus over. Instead of reaching Dracula, the game ends when Brauner is reached.
 Richter mode allows the player to control Richter Belmont and Maria Renard, the latter in the first time as a playable character in an American or European release.  There are a few minor differences in the control scheme, and they begin with all of their mobility upgrades, which allows the player to explore the castle freely from the beginning. 'Richter' is also misspelled as Richiter within dialogue boxes in the main game.
 In Old Axe Armor mode, the player controls the Old Axe Armor enemy. Because there is only one character, the player is unable to switch characters as in the other modes. The character also lacks any magic spells and has only two sub-weapons.
 Boss Rush Mode is separate from the main game; essentially, it is a time attack mode. There are three separate stages to choose from, though initially only one is available.  The other two become available after obtaining the true ending of the game.  Each stage is a series of rooms that the player traverses from left to right. Within each room is a boss or collection of monsters from the game. Depending on how quickly a player completes each stage, they will be rewarded with special items which can be added to the inventory of the normal game. This mode also features a wireless, cooperative two player option.

Nintendo Wi-Fi 
Portrait of Ruin is the first game in the Castlevania franchise with cooperative multiplayer.  However, this is the second multiplayer Castlevania game; Dawn of Sorrow, also for the DS, was the first to have a multiplayer mode.  Players can interact through either the Co-op mode or a Shop mode.  Both modes can connect by local wireless or Nintendo Wi-Fi.  The online cooperative mode allows two players to complete Boss Rushes together.  The character used in this mode can be chosen at the beginning and is selected from a list of characters that is unlocked through standard gameplay.  The Co-op mode is initially limited to one boss-run challenge, but after a file is beaten, two more challenges become available.  The online Shop mode allows players to sell their items to other players.  When another player buys the item, the selling player gains the money, but does not lose the item.

Plot and setting 

Portrait of Ruin takes place in the fictional universe of the Castlevania series.  The series' premise is the conflict between the vampire hunters of the Belmont clan and the immortal vampire Dracula.  The story occurs in Dracula's castle and is set in 1944 Europe during World War II.  In addition to the castle, the main characters explore various different paintings that have been constructed by the villain named Brauner. The paintings act as portals to new areas and feature a distinct look that is different from the main castle.

Characters 
Portrait of Ruin introduces characters to the Castlevania series: Jonathan Morris and Charlotte Aulin. Jonathan is the wielder of the legendary whip, "Vampire Killer", which was passed down to him by his father, John Morris from Castlevania: Bloodlines.  As he is not a direct descendant of the Belmont clan, he is unable to unlock the Vampire Killer's full power without the assistance of a member of the Lecarde family.  Charlotte is a mage and distant descendant of the Belnades clan. The game features the same antagonists as previous Castlevania titles and introduces three new ones. The main villain is Dracula who serves as the game's final boss.

The new antagonists are three vampires that have taken control of Dracula's castle. Leading them is Brauner, an elderly vampire based on the real-life artist Victor Brauner from the same time period.  Brauner recreated Dracula's castle using the souls of the dead from World War II in order to draw power from the castle and plans to use that power to destroy humanity. He disdains humanity because his two real daughters had been killed 30 years prior during World War I. Brauner is able to construct paintings containing pocket dimensions in order to harness the castle's power for his own purposes. He is joined by twin vampire sisters Stella and Loretta. Although the two are vampires, they are actually Eric Lecarde's daughters who were turned into vampires by Brauner, who they believe is their father. In the bad ending, Brauner gives up and escapes from the castle in order to save the lives of his two adopted daughters.

Assisting the two main characters are a priest named Vincent Dorin who acts as a merchant selling weapons, potions, and magic spells, as well as a ghost who introduces himself as "Wind" and provides Jonathan and Charlotte new skills and equipment that once belonged to him if they perform certain tasks called "quests". Wind's identity is eventually revealed to be Eric Lecarde, Stella and Loretta's true father who once fought alongside Jonathan's father to slay Dracula in Bloodlines.

Story 
Prior to the start of the game, the two sisters, Stella and Loretta travel to Dracula's castle in search of their father, Eric Lecarde.  After traversing through the castle, the two arrive at Brauner's lair where they find their father defeated.  Seeing the two sisters, Brauner grabs them and turns them into vampires.  At the beginning of the game, Jonathan and Charlotte encounter Vincent at the gates of the castle, who serves as a merchant.  Upon entering the castle, Jonathan and Charlotte encounter an enigmatic blue figure that they first identify as hostile.  After the figure transforms into a humanoid male, he explains that he was killed a short time ago and had cast a magical barrier to keep himself conscious while still within the confines of the castle.  He introduces himself as "Wind".

Shortly after meeting Wind, Jonathan and Charlotte find one of Brauner's magical portraits.  Unable to destroy it from outside, the two travel into the world within.  Soon, they find Brauner's channeler, a Dullahan.  Shortly after its defeat, one of the vampire sisters appears and disdains their efforts, saying their control is lessened in only a minor degree.  Later, when entering the second portrait, they find Brauner and the two twins; Brauner laughs at the notion of reviving Dracula, as he has failed too many times to control humanity, but concedes his power is too great to ignore.  Both sisters desire to kill the two humans, but Brauner sees Dracula's servant Death as a greater threat, as he could wrest control from him far more easily than them.  While exploring the castle, Charlotte and Jonathan encounter Death, who acts as if Dracula were already revived.  When informed Dracula is still dead, and that another vampire is controlling the castle, he scoffs at the idea of a hand other than Dracula's to rule Castlevania.  Yet, he is gravely disturbed when he sees the statements are true, and promptly leaves to seek a way to destroy Brauner and revive Dracula.

Jonathan and Charlotte encounter Stella at the base of the Tower of Death, and after being promptly defeated, she loses her locket as she flees with her sister.  Opening the locket, Charlotte finds a photo of the twins with Wind, and both decide to question him.  Wind confesses his true name, Eric Lecarde, and that the twins are his children.  Later, Jonathan and Charlotte confront Death, who wants to disassociate himself from Brauner and has no desire to fight.  Nevertheless, he engages them but is defeated and flees.  When Jonathan and Charlotte reach the towering spire of the Master's Keep, they find the Dracula's throne room sealed off, and conclude that Brauner is delaying Dracula's revival to siphon his power.

After searching the castle, Jonathan and Charlotte obtain the Sanctuary spell, a magical attack that dispels curses and allows the dead to rest in peace.  During the battle with the twins, the sisters are cured of their vampirism by Charlotte's spell.  This allows them to regain their sanity, and they subsequently offer to perform a ritual that allows Jonathan to utilize the Vampire Killer whip's full power.  After Jonathan passes the test and defeats the Memory of the Whip, an entity bearing the likeness of Richter Belmont, he is warned against overusing it, as the Vampire Killer drains life force of a non-Belmont wielding the full power, eventually killing the user as it did Jonathan's father.  After the twins are defeated, they open a passage leading to a massive storeroom that contains a portrait leading to Brauner's studio.  The two confront Brauner and defeat him.  When confronted about his acts, he admits justice wasn't on his side, but refuses to acknowledge it was on the heroes'.  Death suddenly hovers from above, and kills Brauner with one swing of his scythe.  This act destroys the painting sealing the Throne Room, and Jonathan and Charlotte then go to battle with Dracula.

Before they can engage Dracula, Death enters the room and sides with his master, and together they attack the heroes.  During the course of the battle, Death and Dracula merge into a more powerful form, but they are eventually defeated by Jonathan and Charlotte.  When destroyed, everyone flees the castle, and sees from the distance as the walls collapse.  Later, the twins, Jonathan and Charlotte are visited in the fields outside the castle by Eric's ghost, who gives some advice to the twins and thanks Charlotte and Jonathan for destroying the curse before his spirit finally fades from existence. As the four of them leave, they end up forgetting about Vincent, who is comically trying to get their attention as he chases after them.

Development 
NCL announced a new Castlevania for the DS on October 5, 2005.  Details of the game were not released until April 21, 2006, when Konami revealed the game's title and its World War II setting. On May 9, 2006, the official trailer was shown at Konami's official press conference. The trailer showcased the smooth player switching and combinations of Jonathan and Charlotte's abilities.  In an interview with producer Koji Igarashi in June 2006, it was revealed the game would try to utilize the touch screen better than Dawn of Sorrow.  He also mentioned he was thinking of incorporating cooperative game play in an unlockable stage via WiFi.  More information concerning online game play were released a month later at Comic-Con 2006, but details on how it would be implemented were still unconfirmed.  At the 2006 Tokyo Game Show, Igarashi confirmed details about the WiFi modes and stated Portrait of Ruin would have a cooperative time attack and an online shop mode.

Because of Nintendo's solid infrastructure for the DS, Igarashi wanted to try the online components, and test for possible online game play, in future Castlevania titles. Igarashi commented the two player game play was homage to Castlevania III: Dracula's Curse, his favorite Castlevania game. The anime style of artwork was retained from Dawn of Sorrow, which Igarashi had switched to in the previous title to appeal more to the younger demographics of the Nintendo handheld systems. Portrait of Ruins development cycle took roughly the same amount of time as Dawn of Sorrow did. Koji Igarashi stated that the schedule became tight due to Nintendo Wi-Fi difficulties, considering it was their first online enabled game.

Audio 

Portrait of Ruin featured English voice-overs for portions of the game.  The original Japanese dialog was also included as an easter egg.  Michiru Yamane returned to compose the music, with additional songs by Yuzo Koshiro.  IGN noted that the style of the music tracks ranged from "hauntingly morose to almost jovially up-tempo".  The audio tracks are also accessible via a "Sound Mode" that is unlocked by defeating Dracula.  The player can also collect records of certain tracks that can be used to replace the game's default background music.  The songs "Sandfall" and "In Search of the Secret Spell" that play in the Forgotten City level are originally from Konami's own King's Valley 2 released on the MSX2 computer, composed by Koshiro.

Merchandise 

There were several pieces of Castlevania: Portrait of Ruin merchandise released along with the game. Strategy guides were released, both in Japan and North America. In Japan, Konami released an official strategy guide. In North America, the official strategy guide was released by BradyGames and featured a complete walkthrough, maps, and item lists. The most notable merchandise was the "20th Anniversary Pre-order Bundle". In celebration of their 20th anniversary of the series, anyone that pre-ordered Portrait of Ruin at any popular game outlet, received a free bundle, along with the game. The bundle includes a variety of Castlevania products contained in cardboard sleeve with a plastic Seal of the Castlevania logo. The products include: a soundtrack CD containing songs from the Castlevania series, a timeline poster covering many of the significant characters and events of Castlevania history, a 48-page art book containing artwork from the entire series, a clear/white game case designed to hold both Castlevania: Dawn of Sorrow and Castlevania: Portrait of Ruin, and an extendable stylus.

Reception 

Portrait of Ruin has met with overall positive reviews and received various awards. Game Informer awarded it "Handheld Game of the Month" for January 2007, and listed it as one of the "Top 50 Games of 2006". Portrait of Ruin also won "Best Original Score" and was runner-up for "Best Adventure Game" in IGN's Best of 2006. Dracula was listed as  the third top villain of 2006 by Game Informer, citing the final boss fight in Portrait of Ruin as the reason. 1UP.com listed it as the "Best DS Game" in their "Best of E3 2006" feature. The audio was well received. GameSpot called the music "excellent" and rated the sound a 9 out of 10. Yahoo! Games rated the sound a 4.5 out of 5. Game Informer called the audio a high point of the game, though complained about Charlotte always shouting the name of her attack. Game Informer also praised the cooperative element and felt that more games should be designed like it. IGN stated that "the dramatic score is enough to send a chill up your spine", though mentioned that amount of vocals was sparse. GameZone ranked it as the ninth best Castlevania game. Robert Workman (an editor for GameZone) complimented it for its changes to the series that came without a sacrifice to quality.

The gameplay received mixed reviews, though most were overall positive. GamePro complimented the multiplayer components and noted that the game "not only reaffirms the series' greatness, but is easily one of the best handheld games released this year." They also rated the game a 4.5 out of 5 in all categories. Eurogamer commented that the two-character gameplay was complicated and sometimes awkward. They also compared it to its predecessor, stating that Portrait of Ruin deviated away from Dawn of Sorrow in terms of gameplay. Game Informer called it "one of the best experiences in gaming" and complimented the story, setting, and game play. Yahoo! Games called the game play "addictive" and praised the two character game play. They also complimented the online multiplayer, the setting, and the freedom to play the game with or without the DS's special functions, but criticized some of the dialog. IGN stated that the game was not "the mind-blowing revelation that Dawn of Sorrow was", but still complemented the "solid" game play and called it an enjoyable experience. GameSpot called it a great game because it "stays true to the familiar Castlevania design and delivers a fun, lengthy adventure." Game Informer mentioned the two character play was "done before, but Portrait of Ruin'''s system is particularly smooth in execution."

Shutaro Iida, who worked on the game as a programmer, cites Portrait of Ruin as his favorite Castlevania'' game out of the ones he worked on.

Notes

References

External links 

  
 

2006 video games
Portrait of Ruin
Cooperative video games
Multiplayer and single-player video games
Multiplayer online games
Nintendo DS games
Nintendo DS-only games
Nintendo Wi-Fi Connection games
Side-scrolling role-playing video games
Video games scored by Michiru Yamane
Video games featuring female protagonists
Video games scored by Yuzo Koshiro
Video games developed in Japan
Video games set in 1944
Video games with alternate endings
World War II video games
Metroidvania games